Kim Jong-suk Naval Academy is a post-secondary educational institution located in Hamhung, North Korea for officers of the Korean People's Navy. Its namesake is Kim Jong-suk, a Korean anti-Japanese guerrilla and North Korean leader Kim Il-sung's first wife. There is a bust in her honor at the academy. It has produced naval commanders, including dozens of Heroes of the DPRK and Heroes of Labor. It is similar in function to the Korean Naval Academy.

History
It began as a naval commander school in 1947. In 1993, it was renamed after Kim Jong-suk. Kim Jong Il, visited in 2009. In 2014, Chairman Kim Jong-un oversaw the shooting competition of the faculty members of Kim Jeong-suk Naval University.

References

 
Naval academies
Universities in North Korea
Korean People's Navy
Military education and training in North Korea